Preston railway station is located on the Mernda line in Victoria, Australia. It serves the northern Melbourne suburb of Preston, and it opened on 8 October 1889 as Preston-Murray Road. It was renamed Murray on 1 August 1905, and renamed Preston on 1 December 1909.

History

Opening on 8 October 1889, when the Inner Circle line was extended from North Fitzroy to Reservoir, Preston station, like the suburb itself, was named after Preston in Sussex, England. The name was chosen by Edward Wood, who was originally from Sussex and, in 1850, opened a general store at the corner of the current day intersection of High and Wood Streets.

In 1967, boom barriers replaced hand gates at the former Cramer Street and Murray Road level crossings, which were located in the Up and Down directions respectively. In 1973, the former ground level station buildings were provided. In 1998, Preston was upgraded to a Premium Station.

On 30 November 2018, the Level Crossing Removal Project announced that the Murray Road and Cramer Street level crossings would be removed by grade separation, with the rail line to be elevated over both roads. On 4 October 2020, designs for the rebuilt station were released, with major construction starting in February 2021. On 30 May 2022, the station was closed to allow demolition and construction of the new station. On 5 September of that year, the rebuilt station opened.

Platforms and services

Preston has one island platform with two faces. It is serviced by Metro Trains' Mernda line services.

Platform 1:
  all stations and limited express services to Flinders Street

Platform 2:
  all stations services to Mernda

Transport links

Dysons operates two routes via Preston station, under contract to Public Transport Victoria:
 : North East Reservoir – Northcote Plaza
 : Preston – West Preston

Kinetic Melbourne operates one SmartBus route via Preston station, under contract to Public Transport Victoria:
  : Altona station – Mordialloc

Ventura Bus Lines operates one route via Preston station, under contract to Public Transport Victoria:
 : Gowrie station – Northland Shopping Centre

Gallery

References

External links
 
 Melway map at street-directory.com.au

Premium Melbourne railway stations
Railway stations in Melbourne
Railway stations in Australia opened in 1889
Railway stations in the City of Darebin